Hur Kyoung-min (Hangul: 허경민; born August 26, 1990) is a South Korean shortstop who plays for the Doosan Bears in the KBO League. He bats and throws right-handed.

Amateur career
While attending Gwangju Jaeil High School, Hur was considered one of the Big 4 shortstops in the Korean high school baseball league along with future KBO stars An Chi-Hong, Kim Sang-Su and Oh Ji-Hwan.

In , Hur was selected for the South Korea national junior baseball team again to compete at the World Junior Baseball Championship, where they claimed their fifth tournament title. In the tourney, he batted .200 (6-for-30) with 2 RBIs and 5 runs, playing in all 8 games as a starting shortstop.

Notable international careers

Professional career
Hur was selected by the Doosan Bears with the 15th overall pick of the  KBO Draft. However, Hur spent his entire 2009 season in the Bears' second-tier team.

After the  season, Hur temporarily left the Bears to serve a two-year mandatory military commitment. He played for the Korean Police Baseball Team in 2010–2011 during his military duty. He returned to the Bears in 2012 and has been with the team ever since.

Notable international careers

External links 
 Korea Baseball Organization career statistics at Koreabaseball.com
 

1990 births
Living people
Sportspeople from Gwangju
Doosan Bears players
KBO League infielders
KBO League shortstops
South Korean baseball players
2015 WBSC Premier12 players
2017 World Baseball Classic players
Baseball players at the 2020 Summer Olympics
Heo clan of Yangcheon
Olympic baseball players of South Korea